Benjamin Dwomoh (July 1, 1935 – September 2013) was a Ghanaian football referee. He refereed one match in the 1982 FIFA World Cup in Spain, between Kuwait and Czechoslovakia in Valladolid.

References

External links 
 
 
 

1935 births
2013 deaths
FIFA World Cup referees
1982 FIFA World Cup referees
Ghanaian football referees